Turkey Creek is a stream in Texas, United States. It rises in Central Tyler county and flows  before converging with Village Creek, east of Kountze, Hardin County. It passes through the  Turkey Creek Unit of the Big Thicket National Preserve on its way south.

Ecology 
The floodplains surrounding Turkey Creek host cypress sloughs, baygalls, swamps and beaver ponds. Tree species found in the associated plant communities include Bald cypress (Taxodium distichum), Tupelos (Nyssa sp.), Sweetbay Magnolia (Magnolia virginiana), water oak (Quercus nigra) and laurel oak (Quercus laurifolia). Arid sandylands and pine savanna wetlands are found in the adjacent upland. Associated tree species found in the drier sandylands include sand post oak (Quercus margarettae) and Bluejack Oak (Quercus incana), while Swamp tupelo (Nyssa biflora) and Swamp Titi (Cyrilla racemiflora) are found in the moist savannas. Longleaf pine (Pinus paluistris) is found in both of these habitats. The creek's drainage is considered one of the most biologically diverse areas in the region. At least 70 species of tree, 50 shrubs, 40 vines, and 468 herbaceous plants are found in the section of the National Preserve it passes trough.

See Also 

 Big Thicket
 Village Creek

References 

Rivers of Texas

Exterior Links 

 Trail map for the Turkey Creek Unit - Big Thicket National Preserve
Rivers of Tyler County, Texas
Rivers of Hardin County, Texas
Geography of Texas